Many prominent persons, especially from the entertainment industry, are interred at Forest Lawn Memorial Park (Hollywood Hills) California.

A 
 Harry Ackerman (1912–1991), television executive producer
 Rodolfo Acosta (1920–1974), actor
 Edie Adams (1927–2008), actress and singer
 Iris Adrian (1912–1994), actress
 Philip Ahn (1905–1978), actor
 Ralph Ahn (1926-2022), actor
 Harry Akst (1894–1963), songwriter
 Robert Aldrich (1918–1983), director
 Irving Allen (1905–1987), producer and director
 Steve Allen (1921–2000), actor, comedian, writer, and television host (unmarked grave)
 Don Alvarado (1904–1967), actor and director
 Leon Ames (1902–1993), actor
 Morey Amsterdam (1908–1996), actor and comedian
 Carl David Anderson (1905–1991), scientist
 Ernie Anderson (1923–1997), television announcer
 Mignon Anderson (1892–1983), actress
 Lois Andrews (1924–1968), actress
 Michael Ansara (1922–2013), actor
 Dimitra Arliss (1932–2012), actress
 Robert Arthur (1909–1986), producer
 Kelly Asbury (1960–2020), animator and film director
 John Ashley (1934–1997), actor
 Gene Autry (1907–1998), actor and singer
 Luis Ávalos (1946–2014), actor
 Doe Avedon (1925–2011), actress and model
 Patricia Avery (1902–1973), actress
 Tex Avery (1908–1980), animator

B
 Art Babbitt (1907–1992), animator
 Lloyd Bacon (1889–1955), director
 Parley Baer (1914–2002), actor
 David Bailey (1933–2004), actor
 Jimmy Bain (1947–2016), musician
 Richard Bakalyan (1931–2015), actor
 Buddy Baker (1918–2002), composer
 Bonnie Lee Bakley (1956–2001), actress and singer
 John Ball (1911–1988), novelist
 Frankie Banali (1951–2020), musician
 Harry Barris (1905–1962), singer, songwriter and musician
 Don "Red" Barry (1912–1980), actor
 Ivor Barry (1919–2006), actor
 Judith Barsi (1978–1988), child actress
 Gordon Bau (1907–1975), film and television makeup artist
 Elgin Baylor (1934–2021), basketball player, coach and executive
 Clyde Beatty (1903–1965), circus owner and lion tamer
 Noah Beery, Jr. (1913–1994), actor
 Noah Beery, Sr. (1882–1946), actor
 Ralph Bellamy (1904–1991), actor
 Richard Benedict (1920–1984), actor and director                                                                                                                                                                                                                                                                                                       
 Brenda Benet (1945-1982), actress                                                                                                                                                         
 Spencer Gordon Bennet (1893–1987), director
 Lamont Bentley (1973–2005), actor
 Frances Bergen (1922–2006), actress, wife of Edgar Bergen.
 Mary Kay Bergman (1961–1999), voice-over artist
 Fred Berry (1951–2003), actor/street dancer/ordained Baptist minister
 Gus Bivona (1915–1996), musician
 Bill Bixby (1934-1993), actor and director                                                                                                                                                        
 Robert Blake (actor) (1933-2023), actor                                                                                                                                                                          
 Willie Bobo (1934–1983), musician
 Priscilla Bonner (1899–1996), actress
 Ernest Borgnine (1917-2012), actor                                                                                                                                                        
 Tom Bosley (1927–2010), actor
 Truman Bradley (1905–1974), actor and television announcer
 Delaney Bramlett (1939–2008), musician
 Chet Brandenburg (1897–1974), actor
 Mary Brian (1906–2002), actress
 Pamela Britton (1923–1974), actress
 Albert R. Broccoli (1909–1996), producer
 Joe Brooks (1923–2007), actor
 Leslie Brooks (1922–2011), actress and model
 Wally Brown (1904–1961), actor and comedian
 Kathie Browne (1930–2003), actress
 Mona Bruns (1899–2000), actress
 Edgar Buchanan (1903–1979), actor
 Mary-Ellis Bunim (1946–2004), TV producer, creator of The Real World and The Simple Life
 Mildred Burke (1915–1989), professional wrestler
 Solomon Burke (1940–2010), singer
 Bartine Burkett (1898–1994), actress
 Everett G. Burkhalter (1897–1975), politician
 Smiley Burnette (1911–1967), actor
 Jerry Buss (1933–2013), majority owner of the Los Angeles Lakers

C
 Darrell Wayne Caldwell (1993-2021), Rapper
 Salvador "Tutti" Camarata (1913–2005), composer
 Godfrey Cambridge (1933–1976), actor and comedian
 William Campbell (1923–2011), actor
 Pete Candoli (1923–2008), musician
 Stephen J. Cannell (1941–2010), producer
 Philip Carey (1925–2009), actor
 Frankie Carle (1903–2001), musician, pianist and bandleader
 Johnny Carpenter (1914–2003), actor, director, and screenwriter
 David Carradine (1936–2009), actor

 John Carroll (1906–1979), actor and singer
 Virginia Carroll (1913–2009), actress
 Nick Ceroli (1939–1985), musician, jazz drummer for Herb Alpert's Tijuana Brass
 Michael Chekhov (1891–1955), actor, director, novelist, and theater practitioner
 Warren Christopher (1925–2011), former Secretary of State and Deputy Attorney General
 Ethlyne Clair (1904–1996), actress
 Bob Clampett (1913–1984), animator
 Bryan Clark (1929–2022), actor
 Robert Clarke (1920–2005), actor
 William H. Clothier (1903–1996), cinematographer
 Bill Cody, Jr. (1925–1989), actor
 Nudie Cohn (1902–1984), fashion designer
 Buddy Cole (1916–1964), musician
 Dennis Cole (1940–2009), actor
 Ray Collins (1889–1965), actor
 Roberta Collins (1944–2008), actress
 Joyce Compton (1907–1997), actress
 Christopher Connelly (1941–1988), actor
 William Conrad (1920–1994), actor
 Bert Convy (1933–1991), actor and television host
 Carole Cook (1924-2023), actress                                                                                                                                                                          
 Wilbur Cooper (1892–1973), Major League Baseball player
 Rita Corday (1920–1992), actress
 Tara Correa-McMullen (1989–2005), actress
 Jerome Cowan (1897–1972), actor
 Willie Crawford (1946–2004), Major League Baseball player
 Gary Crosby (1933–1995), actor and singer
 Scatman Crothers (1910–1986), actor and musician
 Pauline Curley (1903–2000), actress

D 

 Virginia Dale (1917–1994), actress
 Ken Darby (1909–1992), composer
 Hal David (1921–2012), songwriter
 Beryl Davis (1924–2011), singer
 Bette Davis (1908–1989), actress
 Brad Davis (1949–1991), actor
 Gail Davis (1925–1997), actress
 Rufe Davis (1908–1974), actor
 Laraine Day (1920–2007), actress
 Frank de Kova (1910–1981), actor
 Gene de Paul (1919–1988), composer
 Tamara De Treaux (1959–1990), actress
 Frank De Vol (1911–1999), composer, actor
 Rod Dedeaux (1914–2006), longtime USC Trojans baseball head coach
 Sandra Dee (1942–2005), actress
 Reginald Denny (1891–1967), actor
 Vernon Dent (1895–1963), actor
 André DeToth (1913–2002), director
 Ronnie James Dio (1942–2010), heavy metal singer and songwriter, member of Rainbow, Black Sabbath, Heaven & Hell and Dio
 Roy Oliver Disney (1893–1971), businessman, co-founder of The Walt Disney Company
 Edward Dmytryk (1908–1999), director
 Jimmie W. Dodd (1910–1964), actor, singer, and songwriter, host of The Mickey Mouse Club, Mouseketeer
 Drakeo the Ruler (1993–2021), rapper
 Jim Duffy (1937–2012), animator
 George Duke (1946–2013), musician
 Michael Clarke Duncan (1957–2012), actor
 Jerry Dunphy (1921–2002), television news anchor
 Leo Durocher (1905–1991), Major League Baseball Hall of Famer
 Dan Duryea (1907–1968), actor
 Dick Dale (1937-2019), musician

E
 Arthur Edeson (1891–1970), cinematographer
 Anthony Eisley (1925–2003), actor
 Dan Enright (1917–1992), producer
 Josh Ryan Evans (1982–2002), actor
 Michael Evans (1920–2007), actor

F
 Richard Farnsworth (1920–2000), actor
 Marty Feldman (1934–1982), actor and comedian
 William Ferrari (1901–1962), art director
 Jim Ferrier (1915–1986), professional golfer
 George Fischbeck (1922–2015), meteorologist
 Carrie Fisher (1956–2016), actress and writer
 Shug Fisher (1907–1984), actor, singer and songwriter
 Robert Florey (1900–1979), director
 Tony Fontane (1925–1974), singer
 Ruth Foster (1920–2012), actress
 Robert Charles Francis (1930–1955), actor
 Melvin Franklin (1942–1995), singer and member of The Temptations
 Mona Freeman (1926–2014), actress
 Milton Frome (1909–1989), actor
 Bobby Fuller (1942–1966), singer

G

 Reginald Gardiner (1903–1980), actor
 Michael Garrison (1922–1966), producer
 Frankie Gaye (1941–2001), singer
 Wally George (1931–2003), television host
 Andy Gibb (1958–1988), singer
 Hughie Gibb (1916–1992), bandleader
 Paul Gilbert (1918–1976), actor
 Peggy Gilbert (1905–2007), musician
 Haven Gillespie (1888–1975), songwriter
 Roger Gimbel (1925–2011), producer
 Joel Goldsmith (1957–2012), composer
 Claude Gordon (1916-1996), trumpeter
 Floyd Gottfredson (1905–1986), Disney cartoonist
 Alfred J. Goulding (1885–1972), director and screenwriter
 Earl Grant (1931–1970), musician
 R. B. Greaves (1943–2012), singer
 Howard Greenfield (1936–1986), songwriter

H
 Hard Boiled Haggerty (1925–2004), professional wrestler
 Sevil Hajiyeva (1968–2000), Azerbaijani singer
 Barbara Hale (1922–2017), actress
 Monte Hale (1919–2009), actor and singer
 Jon Hall (1915–1979), actor
 Porter Hall (1888–1953), actor
 Thurston Hall (1882–1958), actor
 Stuart Hamblen (1908–1989), actor, singer, and songwriter
 Thomas F. Hamilton (1894–1969), founder of the Hamilton Standard propeller company
 John Hancock (1941–1992), actor
 Jack Hannah (1913–1994), animator
 Ben Hardaway (1895–1957), animator and voice-over artist
 Ann Harding (1902–1981), actress
 Bob Hastings (1925–2014), actor
 Marvin Hatley (1905–1986), composer
 George "Gabby" Hayes (1885–1969), actor
 Jim Healy (1923–1994), sports commentator
 Neal Hefti (1922–2008), composer
 Horace Heidt (1901–1986), bandleader
 Wanda Hendrix (1928–1981), actress
 Buck Henry (1930–2020), actor, director and screenwriter
 Maxine Elliott Hicks (1904–2000), actress
 Higgins (1957–1975), dog actor (urn is buried with trainer, Frank Inn)
 James Day Hodgson (1915–2012), politician
 John C. Holland (1893–1970), Los Angeles City Council member, 1943–67
 Red Holloway (1927–2012), musician
 Sol Hoʻopiʻi (1902–1953), musician
 Anne Heche (1969–2022), actress (actually interred at Hollywood Forever, not Hollywood Hills.)
 Nipsey Hussle (1985–2019), musician
 Michael Hutchence (1960–1997), musician, frontman of INXS

I
 James Ingram (1952–2019), musician, singer and songwriter
 Rex Ingram (1895–1969), actor
 Frank Inn (1916–2002), animal trainer
 Jill Ireland (1936–1990), actress
 Ub Iwerks (1901–1971), animator

J

 James Jacks (1947–2014), film producer
 Dennis James (1917–1997), actor and television host
 Al Jarreau (1940–2017), singer and musician
 Charles Jarrott (1927–2011), director
 Howard Jarvis (1903–1986), political activist
 Sybil Jason (1927–2011), child actress
 Tony Jay (1933–2006), actor and voice-over artist
 Kelly Johnson (1910–1990), aviation engineer
 I. Stanford Jolley (1900–1978), actor
 Mickey Jones (1941–2018), drummer and actor
 Allyn Joslyn (1901–1981), actor

K
 Dick Kallman (1933–1980), actor
 Bob Kane (1915–1998), comic book artist
 Stacy Keach, Sr. (1914–2003), actor
 Joseph Kearns (1907–1962), actor
 Buster Keaton (1895–1966), actor and comedian
 Adolf Keller (1872–1963), theologian and writer
 Lemmy Kilmister (1945–2015), Musician, singer and songwriter of Motörhead.
 Lincoln Kilpatrick (1932–2004), actor (unmarked grave)
 Peter King (1914–1982), composer
 Rodney King (1965–2012), author, activist, police brutality victim and civil rights figure
 Winrich Kolbe (1940–2012), German-American television director
 James Komack (1924–1997), TV producer, screenwriter, director and actor
 Ernie Kovacs (1919–1962), actor and comedian
 Helen Barbara Kruger (1913–2006), fashion designer
 Otto Kruger (1885–1974), actor
 Kay E. Kuter (1925–2003), actor

L

 Jack LaLanne (1914–2011), fitness and nutrition expert
 Dorothy Lamour (1914–1996), actress and singer
 Muriel Landers (1921–1977), actress
 Fritz Lang (1890–1976), director
 June Lang (1917–2005), actress
 Grace Lantz (1903–1992), voice-over artist, voice of Woody Woodpecker
 Walter Lantz (1899–1994), animator and founder of Walter Lantz Productions
 Eric Larson (1905–1988), animator
 Nicolette Larson (1952–1997), singer
 Philip H. Lathrop (1912–1995), cinematographer
 Wesley Lau (1921–1984), actor
 Charles Laughton (1899–1962), actor
 Stan Laurel (1890–1965), actor and comedian, one-half of the Laurel and Hardy duo
 William Lava (1911–1971), composer
 Yvette Lebon (1910–2014), actress
 Arthur Lee (1945–2006), singer, songwriter, musician
 Robert Edwin Lee (1918–1994), playwright and lyricist
 Lance LeGault (1935–2012), actor
 Earl Lestz (1938–2017), studio executive
 Stan Levey (1926–2005), musician
 Liberace (1919–1987), musician
 George Liberace (1911–1983), actor and musician
 Diane Linkletter (1948–1969), daughter of Art Linkletter
 Glenard P. Lipscomb (1915–1970), former US Congressman
 Felix Locher (1882–1969), actor
 Carey Loftin (1914–1997), actor and stuntman
 Hicks Lokey (1904–1990), animator
 Julie London (1926–2000), actress and singer
 Louise Lorraine (1904–1981), actress
 John Lounsbery (1911–1976), animator
 Otto Ludwig (1903–1983), editor
 Art Lund (1915–1990), actor and singer
 Jeffrey Lynn (1909–1995), actor

M
 Kenneth MacDonald (1901–1972), actor
 Harriet E. MacGibbon (1905–1987), actress
 Chummy MacGregor (1903–1973), musician
 Wilbur Mack (1873–1964), actor
 Dave Mackay (1932-2020), jazz pianist
 Marjorie Main (1890–1975), actress
 Albert Hay Malotte (1895–1964), composer
 Shelly Manne (1920–1984), musician
 Jerry Maren (1920–2018), actor
 Richard Marquand (1937–1987), director
 Garry Marshall (1934–2016), writer, director, producer, and actor
 Jack Marshall (1921–1973), guitarist, composer and conductor
 Penny Marshall (1943–2018), actress and director
 Lock Martin (1916–1959), actor
 Strother Martin (1919–1980), actor
 Michelle Triola Marvin (1932–2009), actress
 Joseph Mascolo (1929–2016), actor
 Matty Matlock (1907–1978), musician
 Junius Matthews (1890–1978), actor
 Burny Mattinson (1935-2023), animator, director, producer                                                                                                                                                                          
 Frank Mayo (1889–1963), actor
 Larry McCormick (1933–2004), television news anchor
 Pat McCormick (1927–2005), comedian
 Michelle McNamara (1970–2016), writer and crime blogger
 Caroline McWilliams (1945–2010), actress
 Jayne Meadows (1919–2015), actress
 Ralph Meeker (1920–1988), actor
 Martin Melcher (1915–1968), producer
 Sam Melville (1936–1989), actor
 Rafael Méndez (1906–1981), musician
 Chuck Menville (1940–1992), animator and writer
 Gertrude Messinger (1911–1995), actress
 Donald Mills (1915–1999), singer
 Harry Mills (1913–1982), singer
 Shirley Mills (1926–2010), actress
 Victor Milner (1893–1972), cinematographer
 Chris Mims (1970–2008), football player
 Cyril J. Mockridge (1896–1979), composer
 Louella Maxam Modie (1891–1970), silent film actress
 Paul Monette (1945–1995), author and poet
 Simon Monjack (1970–2010), producer, screenwriter
 Alvy Moore (1921–1997), actor
 Fred Moore (1911-1952), animator
 Vicki Morgan (1952–1983), model, socialite, and murder victim
 Alphonse Mouzon (1948–2016), drummer
 Brittany Murphy (1977–2009), actress, singer, voice artist
 Timothy Patrick Murphy (1959–1988), actor
 Burt Mustin (1884–1977), actor
 John Myhers (1921–1992), actor

N
 Harriet Nelson (1909–1994), actress and singer
 Ozzie Nelson (1906–1975), actor and musician
 Ricky Nelson (1940–1985), actor and singer
 Michelle Nicastro (1960–2010), actress
 Red Nichols (1905–1965), musician
 Jack Nimitz (1930–2009), musician
 Lewis Nixon III (1918–1995), army officer, portrayed in Band of Brothers
 Heather North (1945–2017), actress
 Carroll Nye (1901–1974), actor

O
 Donald O'Connor (1925–2003), actor, singer and dancer
 David Oliver (1962–1992), actor
 Ron O'Neal (1937–2004), actor
 Henry Ong (1949–2018), playwright
 Orangey (unknown), animal actor (cat)
 William T. Orr (1917–2002), television producer and founder of Warner Bros. Television
 Orry-Kelly (1897–1964), costume designer
 Frank Orth (1880–1962), actor
 Bud Osborne (1884–1964), actor
 Chuck Osborne (1973–2012), football player

P
 Joy Page (1924–2008), actress
 Nestor Paiva (1905–1966), actor
 Maria Palmer (1917–1981), actress
 Cecilia Parker (1914–1993), actress
 Eleanor Parker (1922–2013), actress
 Jean Parker (1915–2005), actress
 Hank Patterson (1888–1975), actor
 Don Paul (1925–2014), football player
 Bill Paxton (1955–2017), actor
 Kenneth Peach (1903–1988), cinematographer
 Bill Peet (1915–2002), animator
 Jack Pepper (1902–1979), actor
 Freddie Perren (1943–2004), musician
 Jack Perrin (1896–1967), actor
 Barbara Perry (1921–2019), actress
 Brock Peters (1927–2005), actor
 George O. Petrie (1912–1997), actor
 Esther Phillips (1935–1984), singer
 John Phillips (1935–2001), singer
 Rich Piana (1971–2017), bodybuilder
 Charles Pierce (1926–1999), actor and female impersonator
 Daphne Pollard (1891–1978), actress
 Snub Pollard (1889–1962), actor and comedian
 Tony Pope (1947–2004), voice-over artist
 Jeff Porcaro (1954–1992), musician, drummer for Toto
 Mike Porcaro (1955–2015), bassist for Toto
 Jean Porter (1922–2018), actress
 John Clinton Porter (1871–1959), former mayor of Los Angeles
 Don Post (1902–1979), makeup artist
 Jerry Pournelle (1933–2017), author and journalist
 June Preston (1928–2022), child actress and opera singer
 Freddie Prinze (1954–1977), actor and comedian
 Richard Pryor (1940-2005), actor and comedian                                                                                                                                                                          
 Alan Purwin (1961–2015), helicopter pilot

R

 George Raft (1901–1980), actor
 Amanda Randolph (1896–1967), actress
 Lillian Randolph (1898–1980), actress
 Lou Rawls (1933–2006), singer
 Hugh Reilly (1915–1998), actor
 Bert Remsen (1925–1999), actor
 Ray Rennahan (1896–1980), cinematographer
 Dorothy Revier (1904–1993), actress
 Reynaldo Rey (1940–2015), actor, comedian, TV personality
 Debbie Reynolds (1932–2016), actress and singer
 Bill Richmond (1921–2016), television writer
 John Ritter (1948–2003), actor, son of Tex Ritter, husband of Amy Yasbeck, father of Jason Ritter and Tyler Ritter
 Preston Ritter (1949–2015), musician
 Ramesh (Azar Mohebbi) (1950-2020), Persian musician
 Naya Rivera (1987–2020), actress and singer
 Jason Robards Sr. (1892–1963), actor
 Gale Robbins (1921–1980), actress and singer
 Dar Robinson (1947–1986), film stuntman
 Jay Robinson (1930–2013), actor
 Kasey Rogers (1925–2006), actress
 John Roseboro (1933–2002), MLB player
 Joe E. Ross (1914–1982), actor and comedian
 Ruth Royce (1893–1971), actress
 Miklós Rózsa (1907–1995), composer
 Don Rudolph (1931–1968), MLB player
 Al Ruscio (1924–2013), actor

S
 Sabu (1924–1963), actor
 Boris Sagal (1923–1981), television and film director
 Jack Sahakian (1931–1995), hairdresser and actor
 Ruth St. Denis (1879–1968), dancer and choreographer
 Raymond St. Jacques (1930–1990), actor
 Bill Salkeld (1917–1967), MLB player
 Isabel Sanford (1917–2004), actress
 George Savalas (1924–1985), actor
 Telly Savalas (1922–1994), actor
 Richard Schaal (1928–2014), actor
 Johnny Sekka (1934–2006), actor
 Leon Shamroy (1901–1974), cinematographer
 Reta Shaw (1912–1982), actress
 Larry Shay (1897–1988), songwriter
 Robert Shayne (1900–1992), actor
 Roberta Sherwood (1913–1999), singer (unmarked grave)
 Mickey Simpson (1913–1985), actor
 Doris Singleton (1919–2012), actress
 John Singleton (1968–2019), film director and screenwriter
 Phillips Smalley (1865–1939), actor and director
 Keely Smith (1928–2017), singer
 Roger Smith (1932–2017), actor
 Jack Soo (1917–1979), actor
 Olan Soule (1909–1994), actor
 Tim Spencer (1908–1974), actor and singer
 Jack Starrett (1936–1989), actor and director
 Bob Steele (1907–1988), actor
 Rod Steiger (1925–2002), actor
 George Stevens (1904–1975), director
 McLean Stevenson (1927–1996), actor
 Jay Stewart (1918–1989), television and radio announcer
 Fred Stone (1873–1959), actor
 Bill Stout (1927–1989), journalist
 Glenn Strange (1899–1973), actor
 Victor Sutherland (1889–1968), actor
 Harold Norling Swanson (1899–1991), Hollywood literary agent

T
 William Talman (1915–1968), actor
 Vic Tayback (1930–1990), actor
 Rod Taylor (1930–2015), actor
 Zola Taylor (1938–2007), singer
 Jack Teagarden (1905–1964), musician
 Frankie Thomas (1921–2006), actor
 Martha Tilton (1915–2006), singer
 Wayne Tippit (1932–2009), actor
 George Tomasini (1909–1964), editor
 Pinky Tomlin (1907–1987), actor and musician
 Leo Tover (1902–1964), cinematographer
 Bobby Troup (1918–1999), actor and musician
 Charles Trowbridge (1882–1967), actor
 Forrest Tucker (1919–1986), actor

V
 Virginia Vale (1920–2006), actress
 Lee Van Cleef (1925–1989), actor
 Buddy Van Horn (1928–2021), director and stuntman
 Dick Van Patten (1928–2015), actor
 Wally Vernon (1905–1970), actor
 Katherine Victor (1923–2004), actress
 Al Viola (1919–2007), musician

W
 Jack Wagner (1925–1995), announcer at Disneyland, "The Voice of Disneyland"
 Jimmy Wakely (1914–1982), actor and singer
 Janet Waldo (1920–2016), voice actress
 Paul Walker (1973–2013), actor
 Eddy Waller (1889–1977), actor
 Larry Walters (1949–1993), truck driver known as "Lawnchair Larry" or "The Lawn Chair Pilot who flew a lawn chair with weather balloons"
 Kent Warner (1943–1984), costume designer
 Ruth Waterbury (1896–1982), film critic
 Michael Wayne (1934–2003), film producer and actor, son of John Wayne
 Paul Weatherwax (1900–1960), editor
 Jack Webb (1920–1982), actor, producer, and director
 Reinhold Weege (1949–2012), television writer
 Frank Wells (1932–1994), Disney president
 Billy West (1892–1975), actor and comedian
 Keith A. Wester (1940–2002), sound engineer
 Norman Whitfield (1940–2008), songwriter and composer
 Claire Whitney (1890–1969), actress
 Richard Whorf (1906–1966), actor, director, and producer
 Crane Wilbur (1886–1973), actor and director
 Fred Willard (1933–2020), actor and comedian
 Jess Willard (1881–1968), world heavyweight boxing champion
 Bill Williams (1915–1992), actor
 Cindy Williams (1947-2023), actress and producer                                                                                                                                                                          
 Dick Williams (1926–2018), singer
 Guinn "Big Boy" Williams (1899–1962), actor
 Rhys Williams (1897–1969), actor
 Roy Williams (1907–1976), animator, The Mickey Mouse Club Mouseketeer
 Vesta Williams (1957–2011), singer
 Dick Wilson (1916–2007), actor
 Marie Wilson (1916–1972), actress and comedian
 Scott Wilson (1942–2018), actor
 Paul Winfield (1941–2004), actor
 Charles Winninger (1884–1969), stage and film actor
 Bill Withers (1938–2020), singer
 John Witherspoon (1942–2019), actor and comedian
 Ad Wolgast (1888–1955), boxer
 David L. Wolper (1928–2010), producer
 Tyrus Wong (1910–2016), animator
 John Wooden (1910–2010), UCLA Bruins men's basketball coach

Y
 Ralph Yearsley (1896–1928), actor
 Vasyl Yemetz (1891–1982), bandurist, composer, founder of the Ukrainian Bandurist Chorus
 Snooky Young (1919–2011), musician

Z 
 Paul Zastupnevich (1921–1997), costume designer
 Arnold Ziffel (1964–1972), known as "Arnold the Pig" on Green Acres (urn is buried with trainer, Frank Inn)
 George Zucco (1886–1960), actor

References

 
Forest Lawn Memorial Park
Interments at Forest Lawn Memorial Park (Hollywood Hills)